Devathanam is a neighbourhood Village of Rajapalayam in Virudhunagar district, Tamil Nadu, India.

The name is derived from Deiva vanam.

References

External links
 Arulmigu Nachadai Thavirtharuliya Swamy Temple

Cities and towns in Virudhunagar district
Villages in Virudhunagar district